West Virginia Route 193 (also known as the "Big Ben" Bowen Highway) is a north–south route extending from U.S. Route 60 at Barboursville to West Virginia Route 2 just east of Huntington.

History

Construction began in 1999 on the Merritts Creek Connector, a four-lane divided highway from U.S. Route 60 in Barboursville to WV 2 near Lesage. The highway would bypass the existing two-lane County Route 19 (Merritts Creek Road). A 1/2 mile segment opened in 2000 that linked U.S. Route 60 in Barboursville to County Route 19. A new interchange at milepost 18 on Interstate 64 was completed as part of this phase.

In 2001, a   northern extension from County Route 19 to County Route 24 was completed at a cost of $13.35 million. Signage and all traffic elements were completed but the road was not opened to traffic as it connected to a one-lane county route that was inadequate of handling large traffic volumes.

In late 2003, work began on the final segment of the Merritts Creek Connector that extends from County Route 24 to WV 2 near Lesage after a long delay due to a lack of funding. The final  segment to be completed was projected to cost $15 million and was to be open by October 2004, however, it did not open until March 2005. Later that year, it was revealed with new signs that the Merrick Creek Connector would be designated West Virginia Route 193.

On September 8, 2006, Governor Joe Manchin officially declared that the route would, in addition to its WVDOT designation, would also be named the "Big Ben" Bowen Highway after Ben Bowen, an area toddler who died from cancer.

Major intersections

References

193
Transportation in Cabell County, West Virginia